Rai 1 is an Italian free-to-air television channel owned and operated by state-owned public broadcaster RAI – Radiotelevisione italiana. It is the company's flagship television channel, and is known for broadcasting mainstream and generalist programming, usually aimed towards families, including TG1 news bulletins, prime time drama, cinema and entertainment, and major breaking news, sports and special events.

It was launched on 3 January 1954 as the first regular television service in Italy. It was the only one until 4 November 1961, when RAI launched a second channel. The channel was initially referred to as "Programma Nazionale". It received other names, such as "Rete 1" and "Raiuno" until it adopted its current name "Rai 1". It has the highest viewership in Italy, and regularly competes with Mediaset's Canale 5.

In the United Kingdom, it is available in free to air satellite broadcast from Hot Bird 13B.

Early history 

The first set of programming for Rai 1 was almost completely educational with no advertising, except for the popular Carosello. Early shows were meant to teach a common language to a country torn apart by World War II. Shows like Non è mai troppo tardi... were simply shot in a classroom setting and meant to help with reconstruction. While televisions were not widely available nor affordable, those who could spend the money on them became community leaders and often invited the neighborhood to visit. Bars and cafés turned from places where men would meet to argue or play cards into miniature cinemas where arguments over what show to watch would break out. Women and children were also more accepted inside the bars due to the lack of men post-war and their need to enter working society. Churches also bought televisions are a means of drawing people to spend time as part of those communities.

High-definition feed 
The channel launched an HDTV 1080i simulcast in September 2013, available nationwide on subscription-television providers and on DTT (channel 1). Previously, HD programs used to be aired on Rai HD.

Logos

Directors of Rai 1 

 Giuseppe Matteucci: 1954–1976
 Mimmo Scarano: 1976–1979
 Paolo Valmarana: 1980
 Emmanuele Milano: 1980–1987
 Giuseppe Rossini: 1987–1989
 Carlo Fuscagni: 1989–1993
 Nadio Delai: 1993–1994
 Brando Giordani: 1994–1996
 Giovanni Tantillo: 1996–1998
 Agostino Saccà: 1998–2000, 2001–2002
 Pier Luigi Celli: 2000
 Maurizio Beretta: 2000–2001
 Fabrizio Del Noce: 2002–2009
 Mauro Mazza: 2009–2012
 Giancarlo Leone: 2012–2016
 Andrea Fabiano: 2016–2017
 Angelo Teodoli: 2017–2018
 Teresa De Santis: 2018–2020
 Stefano Coletta: 2020–present

Current programmes

News 
TG1, the main news service, directed by Giuseppe Carboni
TV7, weekly late-night news programme
Rai Meteo, weather bulletin
Speciale TG1, enquiring programme
Porta a Porta, late-night talk show

Events 
Festival di Sanremo
Eurovision Song Contest
Zecchino d'Oro
Festival di Castrocaro
David di Donatello
Junior Eurovision Song Contest

Entertainment 
Tale e Quale Show
La Corrida

L'eredità

Documentaries and Culture 
SuperQuark, hosted by Piero Angela
Quark Atlante, SuperQuark Saturday afternoon spin-off, focusing on wilderness and adventure
Lineablu, focusing on the Mediterranean Sea and shores, hosted by Donatella Bianchi
Linea Verde, focusing on wilderness, agriculture and rural cooking, hosted by Patrizio Roversi and Daniela Ferolla
Overland World Truck Expedition, adventure and documentary expeditions
Passaggio a Nord-Ovest, focusing on history and archaeology
Cinematografo, focusing on cinema
Rewind – Visioni private, focusing on TV history
Magazzini Einstein, focusing on arts and culture

TV Series 
Il Commissario Montalbano, with Luca Zingaretti, produced in HD since Season 9
Il giovane Montalbano (prequel of "Il Commissario Montalbano"), with Michele Riondino and Alessio Vassallo, produced in HD
Don Matteo, with Terence Hill, Nino Frassica and Natalie Guetta, produced in HD since Season 7
Un passo dal cielo, with Terence Hill, produced in HD
Fuoriclasse, with Luciana Littizzetto, produced in HD
Che Dio ci aiuti, with Elena Sofia Ricci, produced in HD
Provaci ancora prof, with Veronica Pivetti and Enzo Decaro, produced in HD since Season 5
Questo nostro amore, historical drama with Anna Valle and Neri Marcorè, produced in HD
Um Himmels Willen, with Fritz Wepper, produced in HD since Season 8
Un medico in famiglia, with Lino Banfi, Giulio Scarpati and Margot Sikabonyi, produced in HD since Season 6
Una pallottola nel cuore, with Gigi Proietti, produced in HD

Sports 

 FIFA World Cup Finals (if Italy team involved only, 1954–2014)
 UEFA European Championship
 UEFA European Under-21 Championship (5 matches: three Italy group matches, one semi-final, and one final)
 UEFA Nations League (Italy matches only, plus a final)
 Italy national football team: Nations League, qualifiers, friendlies, and finals tournament

Kids 
 44 Cats
 Jurassic Cubs
 Prezzemolo
 Tommy e Oscar
 Topo Gigio
 Piccolo Pollone
 Chappy

Early programmes 
Until the autumn 1976/77 season, regular broadcasting was in monochrome (black and white), with very few exceptions (shown in bold). Regular color broadcasting began during the winter 1976/77 season.

Un due tre... aka 1, 2, 3, satire/variety show starring Raimondo Vianello e Ugo Tognazzi. Considered one of the most influential shows in Italian television history, it was discontinued in 1959 after the duo performed an ironic sketch about then-president of the Republic, Giovanni Gronchi (six seasons, from 19 January 1954 to 2 August 1959).
Lascia o raddoppia, a one-hour-long game show hosted by Mike Bongiorno (1955–59, on Thursday, at 9:00 PM, except for the first season shown on Saturday night).
Primo applauso, early talent show hosted by Enzo Tortora and Silvana Pampanini. The clap-o-metre was introduced to Italian television during this programme. Magician Silvan and singer Adriano Celentano debuted in Primo Applauso (from 29 April 1956 until December of the same year, Sunday night, 9:00 PM).
Telematch, variety/game show hosted by Enzo Tortora and Silvio Noto (from 6 January 1957 to July 1958, Sunday night at 9:15 PM).
La macchina per vivere, health care/educational programme about the human body (two seasons, from 31 January 1957, Thursday night at 10:45 PM).
Il Musichiere, one-hour-long Italian version of Name That Tune, hosted by Mario Riva until his death (1957–60, on Saturday nights at 9:00 PM).
Campanile Sera, one-hour-long game show, hosted by Enzo Tortora, Mike Bongiorno and Enza Sampò (1959–61, on Thursday at 9:00 PM). One of the various games on the show, "il gioco dei prezzi", was an early Italian incarnation of The Price Is Right franchise.
Studio Uno, Saturday night variety show, hosted mainly by Mina (1961–66, 9:00 PM).
L'amico del giaguaro, Saturday night comedy/variety show, hosted by Corrado and starring Gino Bramieri, Marisa Del Frate and Raffaele Pisu. Broadcast during 1961, 1962 and 1964 summer seasons, at 9:00 PM.
Giocagiò, daytime half-hour-long Italian version of the BBC children show Play School (1966–70, Monday, Wednesday and Friday, at 5:00 PM)
L'Odissea, eight one hour episodes of a screenplay of Homer's Odyssey, directed by Franco Rossi and starring Bekim Fehmiu as Odysseus and Irene Papas as Penelope. This Italian-German-French-Yugoslavian co-production was broadcast for the first time in Italy from 24 March 1968, on Sunday night, at 9:05 PM. In colour, but the program was shown in black and white in Italy the very first time it was aired.
Eneide, seven one hour episodes of a screenplay of Virgil's Aeneid, directed by Franco Rossi and starring Giulio Brogi (Aeneas) and Olga Karlatos (Dido). This Italian-German-French co-production was broadcast for the first time in Italy from 19 December 1971, on Sundays, at 9:00 PM and in Germany from 5 November 1972. In colour.
Le avventure di Pinocchio, five one hour episodes of a screenplay of Collodi's children novel The Adventures of Pinocchio, directed by Luigi Comencini and starring Nino Manfredi (Geppetto), Gina Lollobrigida (the Fairy with Turquoise Hair), Franco Franchi (the Cat), Ciccio Ingrassia (the Fox), Vittorio De Sica (the Judge) and child actor Andrea Balestri in the main role of Pinocchio. This very successful French-German-Italian coproduction aired for the first time in Italy on Saturday night from 8 April 1972, at 9:00 PM. The French version is about 40 minutes longer and is divided into 6 episodes. In colour.
Fatti e fattacci, variety show, hosted by Gigi Proietti and Ornella Vanoni, direct by Antonello Falqui (four episodes, from 15 February 1975, Saturday night at 8:40 PM). In colour.
Dov'è Anna, drama/giallo miniseries in seven episodes, starring Scilla Gabel and Mariano Rigillo, broadcast on Tuesday, from 13 January 1976, at 8:45 PM.
Albert e l'Uomo Nero (the title, roughly translated, means Albert and the Bogeyman), drama/giallo miniseries in three episodes, starring Nando Gazzolo, Franco Graziosi and then kid Claudio Cinquepalmi in the title role of Albert. Avant-garde soundtrack by Franco Micalizzi. It was perhaps the last successful Italian black and white drama series, aired on 21 March (Sunday), 23 March (Tuesday) and 28 March (Sunday) nights at 8:45 PM.
Bontà loro, one-hour-long late night talk show hosted by Maurizio Costanzo, is considered by some critics to be the first modern talk show in Italian television (two seasons, from 18 October 1976, Monday night, 10:45 PM). In colour from 1977.
Non Stop, one-hour-long comedy consisting of a collage of sketches performed by young and (then) unknown comedians – among these future theatrical actor and director Carlo Verdone and actors Massimo Troisi and Lello Arena. Broadcast for two seasons (1977-8 and 1978-9), on Thursday night, at 8:40 PM.

References

External links 

Official Website 

Italian-language television stations
Television channels and stations established in 1954
1954 establishments in Italy
1